Arthur's Pass National Park is located in the South Island of New Zealand and covers 1,185 km2 of mostly mountainous terrain. Adjacent to it lies Craigieburn Forest Park.

History 
Arthurs Pass National Park was established in 1929, becoming the first national park in the South Island and the third in New Zealand.  Land (Arthur's Pass and the Ōtira Gorge) was originally set aside under the Lands Act 1885 and the Scenery Preservation Act of 1903. This land became the foundation for the national park.

With the railway built, train trips from Christchurch to the Ōtira Gorge began with day trippers visiting Arthurs Pass in 1926. Unfortunately  native flowers were popular souvenirs. Some individuals chose to cut down trees to obtain rātā blooms. As a result, there was a large push to establish national park status for the area. This led to the establishment of Arthur's Pass National Park in 1929. Underfunding meant that this was initially in name only and it took a number of years for the flora and fauna to be fully protected. The first full time park ranger, Ray Cleland, was appointed to Arthurs Pass National Park in 1950. Initially he did not have a work vehicle having to use a packhorse instead. Duties were wide and varied including hut and track building, promotion of the national park, search and rescue, protection of the park environment and enforcing rules and regulations.

In 1901, the Riversdale Flats were gazetted for inclusion in Arthur's Pass National Park, However, when the park was created in 1929, the 1000 hectares of the Riversdale Flats were excluded. These were then incorporated into the Mount White Station lease. In 2007, the Arthur's Pass National Park plan recommended the inclusion of the Riversdale Flats. In late 2021, the status of whether the Riversdale Flats should remain within the Mount White lease or be incorporated into Arthur's Pass National Park was before the courts.

Visitor Centre 
The first national park visitor centre was built in Arthurs Pass in 1959, with the help of the Christchurch Wanderers Tramping Club. It was designed by Christchurch architect Paul Pascoe and used local stone to reflect the geology of the national park. As well as Department of Conservation offices, the building housed museum displays on the history of Arthur's Pass (including Richard Seddon's stagecoach) and archives detailing the history of the National Park. In 2019 the building was declared earthquake prone, and the visitor centre was moved to a portacabin across the road. The cost to upgrade the building to the required standard was estimated at NZ$3 million.

Development of the Park 
The Department of Conservation has looked at developing Arthurs Pass National Park as a destination. There is a desire to encourage more visitors to stay the night. Achieving this would require more high end accommodation and amenities to be built. The report notes that visitors peak over summer. There is a lack of longer day walk options in the park and all weather amenities. The report also suggested that a cable car would be popular to access the tops of the mountains as would hot pools in the village and an upgraded visitor centre. The Department of Conservation had yet to make a decision on the development of Arthurs Pass National Park by June 2021.

Geography
The road passes through Arthur's Pass village and the mountain pass with the same name over the Southern Alps at a height of 920 metres above sea level. The park is administered by the Department of Conservation and operate a depot, administration and information centre in Arthur's Pass village.

The park is very distinctly split by the main divide of the South Island. The eastern side is typically drier and consists of mountain beech forest and wide riverbeds, while the western side contains dense rainforest (which includes mixed podocarp and rata). Much of the geography was formed by ancient glacial action, forming flat bottomed U-shaped valleys. In the middle is a high range, consisting of large, snow-covered peaks and scree slopes.

The park contains the following geographical features:
A portion of the main divide of the South Island, including the following passes - Harman, Waimakariri Col, Arthur's itself, Goat (on the Mingha-Deception route), Tarahuna, Worsley, Minchin and Harper.
The source of the Waimakariri River, very close the Waimakariri Falls Hut.
Numerous tributaries to the Waimakariri River, including the Bealey, Poulter, Hawdon, White, Crow and Anti Crow Rivers.
Numerous tributaries to the Taramakau River, including the Otira, Deception and Otehake Rivers.
Mt Murchison at 2400 m is the highest peak within the park.

Recreation
The park is popular for tramping, skiing, hunting and mountaineering. The Mingha-Deception tramping route is used each February for the running section of the Coast to Coast race

Avalanche Peak 
Avalanche Peak is the only peak in Arthur's Pass National Park that is marked by a poled route to the summit. The climb is a steep but enjoyable 1100 meters  vertical from the Arthur's Pass village. On a clear day, you will be rewarded with epic views of the southern alps.

Devils Punchbowl waterfall 

The Devils Punchbowl waterfall is located close to the northern end of Arthurs Pass Village. This short walk to the waterfall can be completed in under two hours. The start of the walk is at the footbridge that crosses the Bealey River. The walk takes in beech forest resplendent with birdlife. The track climbs a well maintained track to the base of the 131 metre waterfall. where there is a viewing platform.

Mount Rolleston 

Mount Rolleston is one of the highest peaks in the National Park. it is 2271 meters tall. It is a popular mountain to climb and there are multiple ways to climb it The Rolleston Glacier has melted significantly and the degree of the melt in 2011 would be a 1-in-100-year event under natural conditions, but due to climate change this has become a 1-in-8-year event.

Bealey Spur Track 

This is a popular day trip within Arthur's Pass National Park. It is an easy 2.5 hour walk up to the Bealey Spur Hut. The views over the Wamaikariri Basin and surrounding mountains on a fine day are worth the climb.

Waimakariri Basin 

O'Malleys track starts at State Highway 73 and follows the Waimakariri River crossing Turkey Flat to Anti Crow Hut (6 bunks) then on to Carrington Hut (36 bunks). This takes the average fit walker five hours. From Carrington Hut, it is possible to climb Harman Pass (1315m) and cross the Southern Alps. Another trip from Carrington Hut is to continue following the Waimakariri River to Waimakariri Falls Hut  which is 1290 metres above sea level. It contains six bunks and various mountaineering trips can be taken from here into the higher mountains of the National Park.

From Anti Crow Hut it is also possible to cross the Wamakariri River and walk up the Crow river towards Crow Hut which sits at 1020 metres above sea level and has 10 bunks.

Edwards-Hawdon Tramping Track 

This challenging tramping trip travels up the Edwards River, crosses two alpine Passes and then travels down the Hawdon River. The Department of Conservation website describes it as "...best of Arthur's Pass National Park's stunning alpine landscapes. The picturesque hanging valley at Walker Pass is a fitting reward and worth every step over Taruahuna Pass and the steep climb up to Tarn Col". This is typically a two night and three day tramp with stops at Edwards Hut (16 bunks) and Hawdon Hut (20 Huts). It is suitable for very experienced tramping groups only.

Andrews-Poulter Tramping Track 

The Andrews-Poulter is a popular non technical trip on the eastern side of Arthurs Pass National Park. It crosses two passes, the first being the Casey saddle which is surrounded by beech forest. From there, the track leads to Casey Hut. The second day travels along the river flats of the Poulter before climbing through the beech forest to the Binser saddle and then descending to the carpark near the Andrews shelter in the Mt White road.

The Casey Hut was burnt down in October 2015. Fire investigators found that the fire most likely started at the woodstove or close to the hut entrance. Fortunately, the fire did not spread to the surrounding forest. The hut was originally built in the 1969 and had 16 bunks in it.

In 2019, two anonymous donors provided $250,000 for the hut to be rebuilt. DOC plan to built an 8-metre by 5m hut that will contain 12 bunks.

In August 2020, the replacement Casey Hut was opened.  It has some upgrades on the original hut including a more efficient fireplace, double glazing, insulation and solar lighting.

Mingha-Deception Tramping Track 
This is a well known tramping trip that travels up the Mingha river to Goat Pass. Goat Pass hut is located at the pass and has 20 bunk beds. The second day involves travel down the Deception river and multiple river crossings. It is possible to complete a side trip to Lake Mavis from Goat Pass. This trip is used as the mountain run for the Coast to Coast race in the reverse direction. Pest control (trapping stoats, weasels, rats and feral cats) occurs along this route as part of the Blue Duck Recovery Programme.

Carroll Hut Track 
The Carroll Hut Track is on the west coast side of Arthurs Pass National Park, 3 kilometres north of Otira on State Highway 73 at Kellys Creek. The tramp to the hut takes around three hours. It is a step climb through podocarp and broadleaf forest. It provides good views of the Taramakau river on a clear day. The hut itself, has 10 bunk beds and does not have any form of heating. Expect the trip back from the hut to the road to take 90 minutes.

Fauna

Whio 
Seventeen Whio (blue ducks) were released into the park in March 2021. there are less than 3000 whio left in New Zealand.

Kākāriki karaka 
The rarest of New Zealand's six kākāriki species, the orange-fronted parakeet is only found in Arthur's Pass National Park. They are most commonly seen in the Hawdon and Poulter valleys.

Kea 
Kea are regularly seen in both the park and the township. Scotts Track which leads up to Avalanche Peak is often a spot where kea spend time especially close to the tree line. Young kea can often be spotted from the carpark at the viaduct lookout (which is also known as Deaths Corner). This is about 8 km west of Arthur's Pass Village. Kea are also common visitors to the local ski fields (Porters, Cheeseman, Broken River, Craigieburn and Temple Basin).

Great spotted kiwi (roroa) 
These can be heard around Arthur's Pass Village, but being nocturnal kiwi are often difficult to see. There are up to 40 kiwi living in the Bealey Valley.

Weka 
Weka are becoming more common in the western side of the park and occasionally in the Edwards Valley. They have not been sited between the 1920s until a population was re-established near the Taramakau river in the early 1970s. They has slowly expanded their territory and predator control has allowed the population to expand towards Arthurs Pass Village.

Park safety
Arthur's Pass National Park has a reputation as one of the most dangerous national parks in New Zealand. In the first three months of 2006 alone two people died whilst walking in the park. Whilst no formal studies have been conducted, amongst the tramping community and the permanent Arthur's Pass community it is felt that the combination of harsh alpine terrain and easy accessibility combine to contribute to the high death and injury rate.

The mountains around Arthur's Pass contain some very challenging terrain. The marked day walks in the park, all easily accessible from the Arthur's Pass village carparks, involve vertical ascents of around 1000 metres (3000 feet) and include several hours well above the tree line. The peaks are highly exposed to the weather, the tracks are often very steep (steep enough to require the walker to pull themselves up with their hands in some places) and are often marked only by poles strung across a rocky landscape. Below the tree line the bush is dense and thick. In common with many alpine areas the weather is subject to frequent and sudden change. There are frequent bluffs and cliffs and most creeks running down the mountains tumble over waterfalls in one place or another. Further, there are a number of harder routes within the park that require a high level of mountaineering skill and the use of ropes and other such equipment. In short, safely traversing the terrain requires at least a moderate level of experience, knowledge and equipment as it is true 'back country'.

Arthur's Pass National Park is also within a few hours' driving time of Christchurch, the largest city in the South Island of New Zealand. This easy access for visitors to New Zealand, as well as the immediate access to the mountain trails from the village (unlike many other parts of the Alps where getting to the mountains requires a day or more tramp over more gentle terrain, which tends to dissuade the less prepared tramper) appears to lead to larger numbers of unprepared persons overstepping their abilities and getting into mortal peril. The most common scenarios are: persons caught above the tree line in bad weather with insufficient clothing and/or food then suffer from hypothermia; persons attempt a climb that requires knowledge or equipment they do not possess and often become stuck on a ledge or cliff, unable to climb back or continue on due to the steepness of the terrain, often then facing the problems of bad weather/hypothermia; persons attempt a climb that requires knowledge or equipment they do not possess and attempt a maneuver that result in a serious or fatal fall; persons become lost or disoriented, often due to change of weather, lose the trail or attempt to take a shortcut and suffer a serious or fatal fall.

There are numerous reports in the media of people getting lost, caught out by bad weather or falling down mountainsides.

See also
National parks of New Zealand
Forest parks of New Zealand
Regional parks of New Zealand
Protected areas of New Zealand
Tramping in New Zealand
Conservation in New Zealand
Department of Conservation (New Zealand)

References

External links

Department of Conservation information on Arthur's Pass National Park
Arthur's Pass Information - useful website maintained by a knowledgeable local

 
Westland District
Parks in Canterbury, New Zealand
National parks of New Zealand
Protected areas established in 1929
Southern Alps
1929 establishments in New Zealand